Sacramentum is a Latin word meaning "oath" and later "sacrament," and may refer to :

Sacramentum (oath), a Roman oath
Sacramentum caritatis, a post-synodal apostolic exhortation published in 2007
Sacramentum Poenitentiae, an apostolic constitution published by Pope Benedict XIV in 1741

Other
Sacramentum (band), a black metal band

See also
Sacrament (disambiguation)
Sacramento (disambiguation)